Circus Maximus is the debut album by Scottish musician Momus, released on 15 January 1986 on Creation Records. It deals primarily with Biblical and Ancient Roman themes, making reference to figures such as Saul, St. Sebastian, Lucretia, and Solomon. The title, Circus Maximus, refers to the ancient Roman chariot racing and entertainment venue of the same name.

Background and influences
The Guardian has characterised the lyrical content of Circus Maximus as a "skewed reading of certain classical and biblical themes," adding that "the urgent, whispering [Momus] professes himself a masochistic St. Sebastian ('preferring the ache to the aspirin') and sings of 'The Rape of Lucretia' like a Morrissey who had not stopped at an enthusiasm for Oscar Wilde but mined the whole decadent tradition: Pater, Swinburne, Huysmans."

Track listing
All songs written by Nicholas Currie (Momus).

"Lucky Like St. Sebastian" - 3:19
"The Lesson Of Sodom (According To Lot)" - 3:43
"John The Baptist Jones" - 3:12
"King Solomon's Song And Mine" - 3:17
"Little Lord Obedience" - 5:13
"The Day The Circus Came To Town" - 3:25
"The Rape Of Lucretia" - 4:57
"Paper Wraps Rock" - 3:58
"Rules Of The Game Of Quoits" - 4:03

Personnel
Backing Vocals – Jane Davies
Engineer – Noël Thomson
Producer – Momus
Synthesizer [Emulator 2] – Neill Martin

References 

1986 debut albums
Momus (musician) albums
Song cycles
Él Records albums
Folk albums by Scottish artists